Metoyer is a surname. Notable people with the surname include:

Angelbert Metoyer (born 1977), American artist
Cheryl Metoyer-Duran, Cherokee researcher and professor
Herb Metoyer (1935–2015), American singer-songwriter and novelist 
Marie Thérèse Metoyer (1742–1816), American planter